Robin John "Bob" Holden (born 1 December 1932 in Notting Hill, Victoria) is an Australian racing driver. Holden raced small-engined touring cars throughout his career, racing Peugeots in the early 1960s, establishing a reputation for himself which saw him become a regular part of BMC Australia racing program for Minis which culminated with a victory in the 1966 Bathurst 500 co-driving with Rauno Aaltonen. Into the 1970s Holden moved on to race Ford Escorts in various guises, moving into Toyota Corollas in the 1980s, winning the 1.6-litre class at the Bathurst round of the 1987 World Touring Car Championship. In the mid-1990s Holden moved into BMW M3s and later a BMW 318i Super Touring car in which he raced his final Bathurst in 1998, at the time setting the record for most Bathurst appearances.

Holden has continued his involvement in racing through the historic racing scene, and has restored two of his Group C specification Ford Escorts to race in historic touring car racing, although one was recently badly damaged at Oran Park. He has also restored one of his Group A specification Toyota Corolla FX-GTs which he races himself in the Australian Heritage Touring Car Championship for historic Group C and Group A touring cars. Holden is also involved in charity work, helping disadvantaged youth acquire trade skills to help establish themselves in society.

Career results

Complete World Touring Car Championship results
(key) (Races in bold indicate pole position) (Races in italics indicate fastest lap)

References

1932 births
Australian Formula 2 drivers
Australian rally drivers
Australian Touring Car Championship drivers
Bathurst 1000 winners
Living people
Racing drivers from Melbourne
Australian Endurance Championship drivers
People from the City of Monash